Miki (also, Mikk) is a village and municipality in the Astara Rayon of Azerbaijan. It has a population of 935. The municipality consists of the villages of Miki, Qanqalaş, Vaqadi, Giləparqo, and Lobir.

References 

Populated places in Astara District